The South Channel Pile Light is a single-storey octagonal lighthouse in Port Phillip, Victoria, Australia.

It was built between 1872 and 1874 to guide ships through the narrow South Channel and was occupied by lighthouse keepers until 1925. The light ceased operation in 1985, having operated as a navigational beacon for 111 years, and fell into an era of neglect and vandalism. The structure was restored by Parks Victoria in 1998 in accordance with Heritage Victoria guidelines and relocated three kilometres off the coast of Rye Beach.

The site is listed in the Victorian Heritage Register.

See also

 Chinaman's Hat (Port Phillip)
 West Channel Pile Light
 List of lighthouses in Australia

References

Port Phillip
Lighthouses completed in 1874
Lighthouses in Victoria (Australia)
Victorian Heritage Register Greater Melbourne (region)
1874 establishments in Australia
1985 disestablishments in Australia
Unincorporated areas of Victoria (Australia)